Will Moreton (born December 5, 1997) is an American basketball player who plays for Albacete of the Spanish LEB Plata.

College career
Moreton played four seasons for the Stonehill Skyhawks in the Northeast-10 Conference. In 2020, Moreton was named the NE-10 Player of the Year. He became the first Skyhawks player in 22 years to win the award. He averaged 18.9 points and 8.9 rebounds per game as a senior. Moreton finished his career with 1,841 points.

Professional career
On June 24, 2020, Moreton signed his first professional contract with Donar of the Dutch Basketball League. He averaged 7.5 points in the DBL, helping Donar to a semi-final appearance.

In the summer of 2021, Will helped his team win the Twin City Pro-Am (Minneapolis & St Paul).

On September 15, 2021, Moreton signed with the Spanish club Albacete Basket of the LEB Plata.

References

External links
Stonehill Skyhawks bio
Will Moreton on RealGM

1997 births
Living people
Albacete Basket players
American men's basketball players
Stonehill Skyhawks men's basketball players
Basketball players from Chicago
Small forwards
Donar (basketball club) players
Dutch Basketball League players